John Heffernan (born 1963) is an Irish retired hurler. His league and championship career with the Tipperary senior team lasted four seasons from 1986 to 1990. 

Heffernan first appeared for the Nenagh Éire Óg club at juvenile and underage levels, before eventually joining the club's senior team. The highlight of his club career came in 1995 when he won a county championship medal.

Heffernan made his debut on the inter-county scene when he was selected for the Tipperary minor team. He enjoyed one championship seasons with the minor team before subsequently joining the under-21 team. Heffernan later joined the Tipperary senior team, making his debut during the 1986–87 league. Over the course of the following four seasons he enjoyed much success, culminating with the winning of an All-Ireland medal in 1989. Heffernan also won three successive Munster medals and one National League medal. He played his last game for Tipperary in June 1990.

After being chosen on the Munster inter-provincial team for the first time in 1988, Heffernan was an automatic choice on the starting fifteen for the following two years. He ended his career without a Railway Cup medal.

Honours

Nenagh Éire Óg
Tipperary Senior Hurling Championship (1): 1995

Tipperary
All-Ireland Senior Hurling Championship (1): 1989
Munster Senior Hurling Championship (3): 1987, 1988, 1989
National Hurling League (1): 1987-88

References

1963 births
Living people
Nenagh Éire Óg hurlers
Tipperary inter-county hurlers
Munster inter-provincial hurlers
All-Ireland Senior Hurling Championship winners
People from Nenagh